Oliver Höner (born 18 September 1966) is a Swiss figure skating coach and former competitor. A member of EC Zürich, he became an eleven-time (1979, 1980, 1982, 1984–1991) Swiss national champion and placed in the top ten at five ISU Championships – four Europeans and the 1989 Worlds in Paris. His best result, sixth, came at the 1990 Europeans in Leningrad. He also represented Switzerland at the 1988 Winter Olympics in Calgary, finishing 12th.

Höner founded the Art on Ice ice show in 1995. He has also worked as a coach. His former students include Lucinda Ruh, Martine Adank, and Viviane Käser.

Results

References

Swiss male single skaters
Olympic figure skaters of Switzerland
Figure skaters at the 1988 Winter Olympics
Living people
1966 births
Swiss figure skating coaches